Metrodora was possibly the author an ancient Greek medical text, On the Diseases and Cures of Women (Περὶ τῶν Γυναικείων παθῶν τῆς μἠτρας).  She is known from a Byzantine manuscript in the collection of the Laurentian Library in Florence.  If she existed, her dates are disputed, with scholars' suggestions ranging from the first to the sixth century AD, and the latest possible date being the composition of the Laurentian manuscript in the tenth or eleventh century.  Her name is also disputed, and has been suggested to be a pseudonym or even the misinterpretation of the title of her work.

On the Diseases and Cures of Women
On the Diseases and Cures of Women is a medical text preserved as part of a miscellany on a single manuscript, codex 75.3 from the Laurentian Library.  The manuscript dates to the late tenth or early eleventh century, is authored by three different hands, and was probably compiled in Southern Italy. The text was first published by Aristotle Kousis in 1945.  

The surviving manuscript collects various writings on medical topics.  It begins with a section focusing on obstetrics and diseases of the uterus, followed by a more general discussion of women's medicine, a collection of miscellaneous excerpts from medical writers, and finally a series of excerpts from the sixth-century physician Alexander of Tralles.  The first section of the manuscript seems to be a single group of medical recipes which are unrelated to any other known medical works.  Marie-Hélène Congourdeau identifies both the initial section on the womb, and the more general subsequent section on women's medicine, as being by Metrodora;on the other hand Gemma Storti suggests that the text on women's medicine generally should be grouped with the miscellaneous extracts from other medical writers, and that she might have been the author of only the initial section.

The text begins with a discussion of the womb, how it is the source of most women's diseases, and a discussion of hysteria.  This discussion is heavily influenced by the treatise On the Diseases of Women in the Hippocratic Corpus.  The text then discusses general diseases of the womb, conception and contraception, and childbirth.  It also includes discussion of aphrodisiacs and love-potions, diseases of the breasts, and cosmetics.

At some point the Greek text of On the Diseases and Cures of Women was translated into Latin, and it was misattributed to Cleopatra.  This was apparently due to a note included with one of the text's recipes that it was used by Cleopatra.  This Latin translation was published in 1566 by Caspar Wolf, but all manuscripts have been lost.

Identity of Metrodora
The identity of Metrodora, if she existed, is unknown.  Storti identifies three possibilities:

 Metrodora was a medical author whose excerpts were included in the Laurentian manuscript
 Metrodora was both the author of the first portion of the manuscript, and the anthologist who compiled the collection of extracts which makes up the remainder of the text
 Metrodora (meaning "gift of the uterus") was the title of a work misinterpreted as a name

Along with Cleopatra the Physician, Metrodora is one of only two ancient women to have a surviving medical text attributed to her.  Assuming that she existed, her date can only be identified as no later than the compilation of the Laurentian manuscript in the late-tenth or early-eleventh century, and scholars have argued for dates from the first to sixth centuries AD.

Kousis and Giorgiou del Guerra both date Metrodora to the sixth century, on the basis of the extracts from Alexander of Tralles at the end of the Laurentian manuscript.  However, Congourdeau argues in the introduction to her French translation of the Laurentian manuscript that it is a compilation, that only the first section is by Metrodora, and therefore the date of Alexander of Tralles does not help date Metrodora.  Other authors have suggested earlier dates: Ian M. Plant puts Metrodora in the second century AD, and Holt Parker dates her to between the first and fifth centuries.

Metrodora's name has frequently been cited as a reason for scepticism about her existence as a woman medical writer.  Starting with Kousis' initial publication, many scholars have suggested that it derives from the Greek word metra (μήτρα), meaning "womb".  Parker disputes this, calling an such an etymology "impossible", and Flemming says that the name, the feminine form of the common male name Metrodorus, is well-attested.

References

Works cited

Further reading
 

Roman-era Athenian women
Ancient Greek women physicians
4th-century Greek physicians
4th-century women writers
4th-century writers
Ancient gynaecologists
Greek non-fiction writers
Greek medical writers
4th-century Greek women
People whose existence is disputed